El Kantara is a town and commune in Biskra Province, Algeria. The 1911 Baedeker travel guide described it as "one of the most important caravan-stations in E. Algeria." The town is well known for the eponymous gorge nearby, described by locals as the "Mouth of the Desert". The area was named El Kantara by Arab conquerors.

History 
Roman soldiers of the Third Augustan Legion dubbed the gorge Calceus Herculis (English: Hercules' Kick), in reference to the divine hero Hercules' legendary strength. They also constructed an arched bridge over the river in the bottom of the gorge, in order to allow caravans and military supplies to pass through the town with ease.

In the second century A.D., the town and bridge were guarded by Syrian archers who are thought to have planted the first date palm grove in the region.

Present infrastructure 
A highway and railroad follow the same path as the ancient Roman road through the town.

Notable people
 Saïd Chengriha, senior military leader

Gallery

References

External links 

 Images of El-Kantara (including bridge and mosque) in Manar al-Athar digital heritage photo archive resource

Les grandes Familles d'origine Arabe d'El Kantara sont : ABDELAZIZE, BELLAL, HOUFANI, KHIREDDINE, SAADLAOUD, SOURI, YOUB et ZEROUG.
Le reste des familles sont d'origine Berbère.

Communes of Biskra Province
Biskra Province